Neocollyris albitarsipennis is a species of ground beetle in the genus Neocollyris in the family Carabidae. It was described by Horn in 1925.

References

Albitarsipennis, Neocollyris
Beetles described in 1925
Taxa named by Walther Horn